The Outcasts of Poker Flat is a 1919 American silent Western film directed by John Ford and featuring Harry Carey. The film is considered to be lost. The screenplay is based upon the 1869 story of the same name by Bret Harte. Harte's story has been brought to film at least five times, including in 1937 with Preston Foster and in 1952 with Dale Robertson.

Plot
As described in a film magazine, Square Shootin' Harry Lanyon (Carey), proprietor of a gambling hall in Arizona, is in love with his ward Ruth Watson (Hope). However, he believes that she is in love with his pal Billy Lanyon (Landis), and intends to let the youth have the girl. While in this uncertain mind about his own love affair, Harry begins to read Bret Harte's story "The Outcasts of Poker Flat" and begins to liken himself to John Oakhurst in the story. Oakhurst (Carey) befriends a girl named Sophy (Hope) on a riverboat. The girl is being deserted by a gambler named Ned Stratton (Harris), who had promised to marry her, and Oakhurst saves her from self-destruction. Oakhurst brings Sophy to the questionable neighborhood of Poker Flat, and encourages her to marry some youth who loves her, although Oakhurst also cares for her. Stratton reappears and Oakhurst makes it his business to rid the camp of him. Later, the Vigilantes swoop down upon Poker Flat and, in a reform movement, send Oakhurst, Mother Shipton, the Duchess, and others into the hills. Sophy and her young husband follow. They are all caught in a violent storm from which only the latter two emerge alive. Harry Lanyon is impressed with the Bret Harte story, and vows that he will not repeat the mistake of Oakhurst and in sacrificing his love for another. Harry then discovers that Ruth loves him and not Billy after all.

Cast
 Harry Carey as Square Shootin' Harry Lanyon / John Oakhurst
 Cullen Landis as Billy Lanyon / Tommy Oakhurst
 Gloria Hope as Ruth Watson / Sophy, the girl
 Joseph Harris as Ned Stratton
 Virginia Chester
 Duke R. Lee
 Louise Lester
 J. Farrell MacDonald
 Charles H. Mailes  
 Vester Pegg
 Vic Potel

See also
 Harry Carey filmography
 List of lost films

References

External links
 
 
 
 
 lantern slide(Wayback Machine)

1919 films
1919 Western (genre) films
1919 lost films
American black-and-white films
Films directed by John Ford
Films based on works by Bret Harte
Lost Western (genre) films
Lost American films
Silent American Western (genre) films
Universal Pictures films
1910s American films